Gibbovalva singularis is a moth of the family Gracillariidae. It is known from China (Guizhou, Zhejiang, Anhui and Hong Kong).

References

Acrocercopinae
Moths described in 2008